XHFL-FM/XEFL-AM is a radio station in Guanajuato City, Guanajuato, Mexico. Broadcasting on 90.7 FM and 1500 AM from Cerro Aldana, XHFL is known as Radio Santa Fe with a talk radio format. 1500 AM is a United States clear-channel frequency.

History
The concession for XEFL-AM was awarded to José Horacio Septien Echagaray in 1971. The FM counterpart was obtained in 1994.

In 2015, the station received approval to begin nighttime operation on 1500 at 80 watts. The station had been a daytimer for 44 years.

References

1971 establishments in Mexico
Radio stations established in 1971
Radio stations in Guanajuato
Spanish-language radio stations
Guanajuato City